Kyenga (also spelled Tyenga, Tienga, Kyanga, Tyanga, Cenka, Kenga), is a Mande language of Nigeria and Benin. Usage is declining, and the Kyenga are shifting to Hausa in Nigeria and Dendi in Benin.

References

Mande languages
Languages of Nigeria
Languages of Benin